Nature and Culture is a peer-reviewed academic journal published by Berghahn Books that covers the historical and contemporary relationships that societies have with nature. The editors-in-chief are Sing C. Chew and Matthias Gross. The publication themes include cultural reactions and conceptions of nature, ecological restoration, ecological time, as well as political and socio-technical arrangements of landscapes. Some new directions of the journal include environmental technologies and renewable energy cultures.

Indexing and abstracting
Nature and Culture is indexed and abstracted in:

References

External links
 

Berghahn Books academic journals
Triannual journals
English-language journals
Publications established in 2005
Environmental social science journals
Environmental humanities journals
Cultural journals